The wildlife of Somalia includes the flora and fauna of Somalia, which is extremely diverse due to the country's location between the temperate and the tropical zones. Somalia has a long coastline, bordered by the Indian Ocean in the east and Red Sea in the north. The northwestern and central parts of the country are arid, or very dry. The southern and northeastern regions are semi-arid, receiving slightly more rainfall than the central and northwest regions. The coastal region is more humid due to its proximity to the ocean. Somalia is home to over 727 species of birds and boasts over 177 species of mammals.

The Nile crocodile, the largest crocodilian found in Africa, is very common in southern Somalia. Somalia is home to a diverse variety of flora and fauna, from acacia trees, to birds, large cats, and reptiles large and small.

In some areas, the mountains are covered with shrubs such as pyracantha, jasmine, poinsettia, and a varied assortment of evergreens. Caraway, carcade, cardamom, coriander, incense, myrrh, and red pepper are common.

Lexicology
There are many forms of terminology and ways of describing the subphylums, metonyms and classifications of the various animals living within Somalia.

Fauna

Mammals

Somalia contains a variety of mammals due to its geographical and climatic diversity. Wild animals are found in every region. Among them are the lion, Somali cheetah, reticulated giraffe, hamadryas baboon, civet, serval, African bush elephant, bushpig, Soemmerring's gazelle, antelope, ibex, kudu, dik-dik, oribi, reedbuck, Somali wild ass, Grévy's zebra, and hyena.

Elephants were also found in Somaliland. Since elephants are migratory, they are found in a variety of habitats, such as woodland, savanna, and tropical forests. The yellow-spotted rock hyrax, which is found in savanna and rocky areas, looks much like a large rodent, but is actually related to elephants. The golden mole lives in savanna.

The following mammals are found exclusively in Somalia:
Berbera gerbil
Greenwood's shrew
Brockman's gerbil

Birds

Somalia is currently home to about 727 species of birds, of which eight are endemic, one has been introduced by humans and one is rare or accidental. Fourteen species are globally threatened.
The following species of birds are found exclusively in Somalia:
Columba oliviae - Somali pigeon 
Laniarius nigerrimus - black boubou
Alaemon hamertoni - lesser hoopoe-lark
Heteromirafra archeri - Archer's lark
Mirafra ashi - Ash's bushlark
Mirafra somalica - Somali bushlark
Spizocorys obbiensis - Obbia lark
Carduelis johannis - Warsangli linnet

Reptiles

Somalia has roughly 235 species of reptiles, of which almost half live in its northern areas.
The Nile crocodile is very common in southern Somalia, and is the largest crocodilian found in Africa. Adult males can grow to between 12 and 16 feet long.

Other reptiles unique to Somalia include Hughes' saw-scaled viper, the southern Somali garter snake, Platyceps messanai, Scortecci's diadem snake (Spalerosophis josephscorteccii), the Somali sand boa, the angled worm lizard, Macfadyen's mastigure (Uromastyx macfadyeni), Lanza's gecko (Hemidactylus granchii), the semaphore gecko, and a wall lizard from either Mesalina or Eremias. The colubrid snake (Aprosdoketophis andreonei) and Haacke-Greer's skink (Haackgreerius miopus) are endemic genera.

Fish

With 3300 km of coastline facing the Indian Ocean, Somalia has the longest coastline in continental Africa. Somali waters are prime fishing grounds for migratory fish such as tuna and tuna-like species, and a narrow but productive continental shelf is the home to several demersal fish and crustacean species.

Fish species found exclusively in Somalia include:
Cirrhitichthys randalli
Symphurus fuscus
Parapercis simulata
Cociella somaliensis
Pseudochromis melanotus

Flora

The highlands, which in an almost continuous line traverse East Africa, have to a great extent isolated the flora of Somalia in spite of the general resemblance of its climate and soil to the country on the western side of the band of high ground. The greater part of the country is covered either with tall coarse grasses, or more commonly with thick thorn-bush or jungle, among which rise occasional isolated, trees. The prevalent bush plants are khansa, 
acacias, aloes, and, especially, Boswellia and Commiphora, which yield highly fragrant resins and balsams, such as myrrh, frankincense (olibanum) and balm of Gilead.

Among the larger trees are the mountain cedar, reaching to 100 ft.; the gob, which bears edible berries in appearance something like the cherry with the taste of an apple, grows to some 80 ft, and is found fringing the river beds. 
There are patches of dense reeds, reaching 10 ft high, and thickets of tamarisk along the river beds, and on either side the jungle is high and more luxuriant than on the open plateau. Of herbaceous plants the kissenia, the sole representative of the order Loasaceae, which is common in America but very rare elsewhere, is found in Somalia, which also possesses forms belonging to the eastern Mediterranean flora.

The following vascular plant genera are found exclusively in Somalia:
Eriostylos 1 sp. Amaranthaceae
Polyrhabda 1 sp. Amaranthaceae
Goydera 1 sp. Apocynaceae
Whitesloanea 1 sp. Apocynaceae
Puccionia 1 sp. Cleomaceae
Afrotrichloris 2 spp. Gramineae
Pseudozoysia 1 sp. Gramineae
Taeniorhachis 1 sp. Gramineae
Renschia 1 sp. Labiatae
Symphyochlamys 1 sp. Malvaceae

Notes

References

Biota of Somalia
Somalia